Back on the Streets is an album by Tower of Power released in 1979.  This was their last album with Columbia Records.  The title derives from the song "Back on the Streets Again" from their debut album East Bay Grease.  David Garibaldi returns to the drummer's spot a third time, only to leave after this album, again.  (He would not return again until 1998, and he's stayed for good since.)  It also marked the debut of bassist Vito San Filippo and guitarist Danny Hoefer.  This would be Hoefer's only album as a member of Tower of Power.

Track listing
 "Rock Baby" (Crockett, Michael Jeffries) – 4:48
 "Our Love" (Clifford Coulter, McGee) – 3:34
 "Heaven Must Have Made You" (Geoffrey Leib) – 3:33
 "And You Know It" (Emilio Castillo, Kupka) – 3:02
 "Nowhere to Run" (Lamont Dozier, Eddie Holland, Brian Holland) – 4:35
 "Something Calls Me" (Lenny Pickett) – 4:24
 "It Takes Two (To Make It Happen)" (Emilio Castillo, David Garibaldi, Michael Jeffries, Thompson) – 3:37
 "In Due Time" (duet with Cheryl Lynn) (Crockett, Jeffries) – 4:10
 "Just Make A Move (And Be Yourself)" (Thompson) – 5:10

Personnel 
Tower of Power
 Michael Jeffries – lead and backing vocals
 Chester Thompson – acoustic piano, Fender Rhodes, clavinet, organ, Minimoog, backing vocals, horn arrangements (1, 5, 7, 8, 9), string arrangements (7), organ solo (9)
 Danny Hoefer – guitars, guitar solo (4)
 Vito San Filippo – bass, backing vocals
 David Garibaldi – drums, Syndrums
 Emilio Castillo – tenor saxophone, backing vocals
 Lenny Pickett – synthesizers, alto saxophone, soprano saxophone, tenor saxophone, tenor sax solo (5), backing vocals, horn arrangements (6)
 Stephen "Doc" Kupka – baritone saxophone, backing vocals
 Mic Gillette – trombone, bass trombone, trumpet, flugelhorn, piccolo trumpet, backing vocals
 Greg Adams – trumpet, flugelhorn, backing vocals, horn arrangements (4)

Additional musicians
 Greg Crockett – guitars (8)
 Paulinho da Costa – percussion (1, 5)
 Eddie "Bongo" Brown – percussion (2, 5)
 Bill Lamb – brass (1, 2, 3, 5)
 Gayle Levant – harp (3)
 Tower of Power – rhythm arrangements (1, 2, 3, 5)
 McKinley Jackson – rhythm arrangements (1, 2, 3, 5), horn arrangements (3), string arrangements (3)
 Richard Evans – string arrangements (8)
 Harry Bluestone – concertmaster (2, 3)
 Sol Bobrov – concertmaster (7, 8)
 The Jones Girls – backing vocals (1, 2, 3, 5)
 Cheryl Lynn – lead vocals (8)

Production 
 Emilio Castillo – producer, mixing supervisor 
 McKinley Jackson – producer (1, 2, 3, 5)
 Richard Evans – producer (4, 6-9)
 Tower of Power – co-producers
 Alan Chinowsky – engineer, mixing
 Jim Gaines – engineer, mixing
 Paul Serrano – engineer
 Michael Stone – mixing
 Steve Fontano – assistant engineer 
 Phil Jamtaas – assistant engineer 
 Rick Sanchez – assistant engineer 
 John Golden – original mastering 
 Vic Anesini – 1993 digital remastering 
 Bruce Steinberg – art direction, design, photography
 Steve Zeifman – color printing
 Jeff World Associates – management 

Studios
 Recorded at Record Plant, Los Angeles (California); Record Plant, Sausalito (California); United Western Recorders (Hollywood, California); Universal Recording Studio and P.S. Recording Studios (Chicago, Illinois).
 Mixed at Record Plant, Los Angeles and Record Plant, Sausalito.
 Mastered at Kendun Recorders (Burbank, California).
 Remastered at Sony Music Studios (New York City, New York).

References

1979 albums
Tower of Power albums
Columbia Records albums